"Still Got a Long Way to Go" is a collaborative song by ARIA Award-winning Australian musicians, Jimmy Barnes with Diesel.  
It was released on 2CD format as the third and final single from Barnes' album Flesh and Wood (1993). Barnes and Diesel performed the song on live TV. and a black and white music video was released to promote the song.

Track listings
 White Disc
 "Still Got A Long Way To Go" (Diesel)	
 "You Can't Make Love Without A Soul" (Live)  (by Jimmy Barnes) (Barnes, Wilson)
 "Flame Trees"(Live) (by Jimmy Barnes) (Steve Prestwich, Don Walker)
 "(Sittin' On) The Dock of the Bay" (Live) (by Jimmy Barnes) (Steve Cropper, Otis Redding)

 The live tracks 2-4 were recorded at Triple M Sydney  on 23 February 1994.

 Black Disc
 "Still Got A Long Way To Go" (with Diesel) 
 "I Saw Her Standing There" (Live) (John Lennon, Paul McCartney) (by Jimmy Barnes)
 "I'd Rather Be Blind" (Live) (Barnes) (by Jimmy Barnes)
 "Catch Your Shadow" (Live) (Barnes, Neill, Wilson Wilson) (by Jimmy Barnes)
 "Still Got A Long Way To Go" (Live)

 The live tracks 2-4 were recorded in Hamburg, Germany on 28 January 1994.
 The live track 5 was recorded in Channel 7 Studios, Sydney on 11 December 1993

Credits
 Acoustic Guitar – Diesel 
 Arranged By [Strings] – John Philip Shenale 
 Backing Vocals – Jessica Williams, Portia Griffin, Wendy Frasier)
 Bass – Matt Branton 
 Cello – Nancy Stein-Ross
 Drums – Roy Martin
 Vibraphone [Vibes] – Guy Davis
 Viola – James Ross
 Violin – Ezra Kilger, Nancy Rothin

Weekly charts

References

Mushroom Records singles
1994 singles
1994 songs
Jimmy Barnes songs
Diesel (musician) songs
Songs written by Diesel (musician)